Zim and Co. is a 2005 French comedy film directed by Pierre Jolivet. 

It was screened in the Un Certain Regard section at the 2005 Cannes Film Festival. The film won the Grand Prize of the of the third Festival of European Film in Ljubljana (2008), organized by EUNIC (the European Union of National Institutes for Culture). Adrien Jolivet, in his first film, who also co-composed the soundtrack, was nominated for the César Meilleur Espoir Masculin (Most Promising Newcomer) in 2006.

Plot
Following a accident where he crashes his motorbike into a car, 20-year-old Zim is arrested; the judge agrees to allow him to avoid jail, if he finds a proper job within a month. The only job he finds, requires a car and driving licence and he has neither. His friends rally to help him out.

Cast
 Adrien Jolivet - Victor Zimbietrovski, called Zim
 Mhamed Arezki - Cheb
 Yannick Nasso - Arthur
 Naidra Ayadi - Safia
 Nathalie Richard - Zim's mother
 Nicolas Marié - M. Rangin
 Maka Kotto - Père Arthur
 Abbes Zahmani - Nourdine
 Jean-Philippe Vidal - Pascal
 Guilaine Londez - The judge
 Vincent Grass - The teacher
 Michelle Goddet - The mother of Cheb
 Nada Strancar - Madame Merceron
 Wilfried Romoli - Will
 Jean-Claude Frissung - The old worker
 Pierre Diot - Sport-In head of personnel

References

External links
 

2005 films
2005 comedy films
2000s French-language films
Films directed by Pierre Jolivet
French comedy films
2000s French films